Étienne Bierry (13 October 1918  - 4 July 2015 ) was a French stage and film actor as well as a theatre director.

With his spouse Renée Delmas, Étienne Bierry was managing director of the Théâtre de Poche Montparnasse from 1958 to 2011. He was the father of Liliane Bierry, Florence Génin, Marion Bierry, theatre director and Stéphane Bierry, comedian

Filmography

Cinema 

 1961 : La Peau et les Os by Jean-Paul Sassy - (Gagnaire)
 1961 : The Nina B. Affair by Robert Siodmak - (Dietrich)
 1961 : Le Tracassin by Alex Joffé - (the agent in front of the foreign ambassy)
 1962 : Les Culottes rouges by Alex Joffé - (Schmidt, le chef de baraque)
 1962 : Horace 62 by André Versini
 1962 : Le Bateau d'Émile by Denys de La Patellière - (Marcelin, a fisherman)
 1962 : Le Monte-Charge by Marcel Bluwal - (Un bistrot)
 1963 : Ballade pour un voyou by Claude-Jean Bonnardot - (Max)
 1964 : Le Gros Coup by Jean Valère - (L'hôtelier)
 1964 : Requiem pour un caïd by Maurice Cloche - (inspector Le Gall)
 1965 : The Shameless Old Lady by René Allio - (Albert)
 1965 : Le Faiseur by Jean-Pierre Marchand
 1965 : Les Survivants by Dominique Genee
 1966 : Objectif 500 millions by Pierre Schoendoerffer - (Douard)
 1966 : Le Voyage du père by Denys de La Patellière - (Le bistrot)
 1966 : Thursday We Shall Sing Like Sunday by Luc de Heusch - (Devos)
 1969 : Sous le signe du taureau by Gilles Grangier - (Lambert, a technician)
 1971 : Le Miroir 2000 by Jean Couturier & François Villiers
 1971 : Le Saut de l'ange by Yves Boisset
 1975 : La Soupe froide by Robert Pouret - (Maury)
 1975 : Raging Fists by Éric Le Hung - (the father)
 1975 : A Happy Divorce by Henning Carlsen - (Pierre)
 1977 : Pourquoi ? by Anouk Bernard - (the father)
 1989 : Pentimento by Tonie Marshall - (Lambert)
 1999 : Sachs' Disease by Michel Deville - (M. Ménard)
 2004 : Un 14 juillet short film by Nathalie Saugeon - (the man)

Television 

 1959 :  : L'Enigme de Pise by Stellio Lorenzi
 1959 : La caméra explore le temps : Le Véritable Aiglon by Stellio Lorenzi
 1959 : Marie Stuart (by Friedrich Schiller), téléfilm by Stellio Lorenzi : Davidson
 1961 : La caméra explore le temps : L'Enigme de Saint-Leu by Stellio Lorenzi
 1961 : Les Cinq Dernières Minutes, épisode L'Avoine et l'Oseille by Claude Loursais
 1962 : L'inspecteur Leclerc enquête La Trahison de Leclerc by Marcel Bluwal
 1962 : Le Théâtre de la jeunesse : Un pari de milliardaire by Marcel Cravenne
 1964 : La caméra explore le temps : Le Drame de Mayerling by Stellio Lorenzi
 1964 : La caméra explore le temps : La Terreur et la vertu by Stellio Lorenzi
 1966 : La caméra explore le temps : Les Cathares by Stellio Lorenzi
 1966 : Derrière l'horizon by Jean-Pierre Marchand
 1966 : La Grande Peur dans la montagne by Pierre Cardinal
 1967 : En votre âme et conscience, L'Affaire Dumollard : as Dumollard
 1967 : La Bouquetière des innocents by Lazare Iglesis
 1967 :  : L'Inspecteur Cadavre by Michel Drach, Cavre
 1968 : Les Bas-fonds by Jean-Paul Sassy
 1971 : Les Nouvelles Aventures de Vidocq by Marcel Bluwal
 1972 : La Vallée sans printemps by Claude-Jean Bonnardot
 1973 : Un client sérieux by Jean Bertho
 1973 : Au bout du rouleau by Claude-Jean Bonnardot
 1973 : La Ligne de démarcation by Jacques Ertaud
 1974 : Taxi de nuit by Jean Leduc
 1974 : Un bon patriote by Gérard Vergez
 1974 : Le Vagabond by Claude-Jean Bonnardot
 1974 : L'Homme du fleuve by Jean-Pierre Prévost
 1975 : Pays by Jacques Krier
 1976 : Grand-Père Viking by Claude-Jean Bonnardot
 1976 : Le Cousin Pons by Guy Jorré
 1977 : La Foire by Roland Vincent
 1978 : Double Détente by Claude-Jean Bonnardot
 1979 : Pierrette by Guy Jorré
 1980 : Le Petit Théâtre d'Antenne 2 : En attendant Polo by Georges Sonnier, TV director Roland Coste
 1981 : La Vie des autres (episode "Christophe"), TV serial by Gilles Legrand
 1982 : Les Amours des années grises : Histoire d'un bonheur by Marion Sarraut
 1982 : Ralentir école by Alain Dhouailly
 1982 : L'Enfant et les magiciens by Philippe Arnal
 1990 : Les Cinq Dernières Minutes : Le Miroir aux alouettes by Guy Jorré
 1991 : Marie la louve by Daniel Wronecki

Theatre

Comedian 

 1950 : Junon et le paon by Seán O'Casey, directed by Philippe Kellerson, Théâtre de l'Œuvre
 1951 : Les Radis creux by Jean Meckert, directed by Pierre Valde, Théâtre de Poche Montparnasse
 1955 : Le Scieur de long by Marcel Moussy, Théâtre du Tertre
 1956 : The Lower Depths by Maxim Gorky, directed by Sacha Pitoëff, Théâtre de l'Œuvre
 1958 : Gontran 22 by Alexandre Arnoux, directed by Robert Marcy, Théâtre des Bouffes-Parisiens
 1958 : Procès à Jésus by Diego Fabbri, directed by Marcelle Tassencourt, Théâtre Hébertot
 1958 : Éboulement au quai nord by Ugo Betti, directed by Marcelle Tassencourt, Théâtre de Poche Montparnasse
 1959 : Les Petits Bourgeois by Maxim Gorky, directed by Grégory Chmara, Théâtre de l'Œuvre
 1959 : Le Client du matin by Brendan Behan, directed by Georges Wilson, Théâtre de l'Œuvre
 1961 : Waiting for Godot by Samuel Beckett, directed by Roger Blin, Théâtre de l'Odéon
 1962 : Baby foot by Robert Soulat, directed by Gabriel Garran, Théâtre de Poche Montparnasse
 1962 : L'Étoile devient rouge by Seán O'Casey, directed by Gabriel Garran, Théâtre de la Commune, Théâtre Récamier
 1963 : Les Viaducs de la Seine-et-Oise by Marguerite Duras, directed by Claude Régy, Poche Montparnasse
 1963 : Les Enfants du soleil by Maxim Gorky, directed by Georges Wilson, TNP Théâtre de Chaillot
 1964 : Les Viaducs de la Seine-et-Oise by Marguerite Duras, directed by Claude Régy, Poche Montparnasse
 1964 : La Tragédie de la vengeance after Cyril Tourneur, directed by Francis Morane and Jean Serge, Théâtre Sarah-Bernhardt
 1964 : Le Trèfle fleuri by Rafael Alberti, directed by Pierre Debauche, Théâtre Daniel Sorano Vincennes
 1964 : Uncle Vanya by Anton Chekov, directed by Sacha Pitoëff, Théâtre Moderne
 1966 : Vous vivrez comme des porcs by John Arden, directed by Guy Rétoré, Théâtre de l'Est parisien
 1967 : Le Duel d'Anton Tchekov, directed by André Barsacq, Théâtre de l'Atelier
 1968 : Biedermann et les incendiaires by Max Frisch, directed by Bernard Jenny, Théâtre du Vieux-Colombier
 1969 : Les Nonnes by Eduardo Manet, directed by Roger Blin, Théâtre de Poche Montparnasse
 1970 : Amédée, or How to Get Rid of It by Eugène Ionesco, directed by Jean-Marie Serreau, Théâtre de Poche Montparnasse
 1971 : La Peau d'un fruit sur un arbre pourri by Victor Haïm, directed by Jean-Paul Roussillon, Théâtre de Poche Montparnasse
 1974 : Chez Pierrot by Jean-Claude Grumberg, directed by Gérard Vergez, Théâtre de l'Atelier
 1975 : La Caverne d'Adullam by Jean-Jacques Varoujean, directed by Étienne Bierry, Théâtre de Poche Montparnasse
 1977 : Lady Strass by Eduardo Manet, directed by Roger Blin, Théâtre de Poche Montparnasse
 1979 : Neige by Romain Weingarten, directed by the author, Théâtre de Poche Montparnasse
 1981 : Le Butin by Joe Orton, directed by Étienne Bierry, Théâtre de Poche Montparnasse
 1981 : Accordez vos violons by Victor Haïm, directed by Étienne Bierry, Théâtre de Poche Montparnasse
 1981 : Interviouve by Louis-Ferdinand Céline, directed by Jean Rougerie, Théâtre de Poche Montparnasse
 1982 : Baron, Baronne by Jean-Jacques Varoujean, directed by Étienne Bierry, Théâtre de Poche Montparnasse
 1982 : Souvenirs du faucon maltais by Jean-Pierre Enard, directed by Étienne Bierry, Théâtre de Poche Montparnasse
 1983 : Krapp's Last Tape by Samuel Beckett, directed by Michel Dubois, Théâtre de Poche Montparnasse
 1984 : L'Elève de Brecht by Bernard Da Costa, directed by Nicolas Bataille, Théâtre de Poche Montparnasse
 1984 : La Dernière Classe by Brian Friel, directed by Jean-Claude Amyl, Théâtre des Mathurins
 1985 : Fool for love by Sam Shepard, directed by Andréas Voutsinas, Espace Pierre Cardin
 1986 : Amédée, or How to Get Rid of It by Eugène Ionesco, directed by Étienne Bierry, Théâtre de Poche Montparnasse
 1987 : Variations sur le canard by David Mamet, directed by Jacques Seiler, Théâtre de Poche Montparnasse
 1988 : Docteur Raguine after Anton Chekov, directed by Julian Negulesco, Théâtre de Poche Montparnasse
 1988 : Krapp's Last Tape by Samuel Beckett, directed by Étienne Bierry, Théâtre de Poche Montparnasse
 1988 : Le Plus Heureux des trois by Eugène Labiche, directed by Étienne Bierry, Théâtre de Poche Montparnasse
 1989 : Visite d'un père à son fils by Jean-Louis Bourdon, directed by Georges Werler, Théâtre de Poche Montparnasse
 1990 : Chambre 108 by Gérald Aubert, directed by Georges Werler, Théâtre de Poche Montparnasse
 1992 : Montaigne ou Dieu que la femme me reste obscure by Robert Pouderou, directed by Pierre Tabard, Théâtre de Poche Montparnasse
 1992 : Clotilde et moi after the Contes cruels by Octave Mirbeau, directed by Marion Bierry, Théâtre de Poche Montparnasse
 1994 : Silence en coulisses ! by Michael Frayn, directed by Jean-Luc Moreau, Théâtre du Palais-Royal
 1994 : Retour à Pétersbourg by Gilles Costaz, directed by Georges Werler, Théâtre de Poche Montparnasse
 1998 : Horace by Corneille, directed by Marion Bierry, Théâtre de l'Œuvre
 2000 : Le Chant du crapaud by Louis-Charles Sirjacq, directed by Julian Negulesco, Théâtre de Poche Montparnasse
 2002 : L'Embrasement des Alpes by Peter Turrini, directed by Georges Werler, Théâtre de Poche Montparnasse
 2003 : Coco Perdu by Louis Guilloux, directed by Stéphane Bierry, Théâtre de Poche Montparnasse
 2005 : Sur un air de tango by Isabelle de Toledo, directed by Annick Blancheteau & Jean Mourière, Théâtre de Poche Montparnasse
 2007 : L'Illusion comique by Corneille, directed by Marion Bierry, Théâtre de Poche Montparnasse, Théâtre Hébertot
 2008 : Ivanov by Anton Chekov, directed by Philippe Adrien, Théâtre de la Tempête
 2010 : Ivanov by Anton Chekov, directed by Philippe Adrien, Théâtre de la Tempête, tournée

Theater director 

 1960 : Les Radis creux by Jean Meckert, Théâtre de Poche Montparnasse
 1975 : La Caverne d'Adullam by Jean-Jacques Varoujean, Théâtre de Poche Montparnasse
 1976 : Les Moutons de la nuit by Denise Bonal, Théâtre de Poche Montparnasse
 1976 : Isaac et la sage femme by Victor Haïm, Théâtre de Poche Montparnasse
 1977 : Un ennemi du peuple by Henrik Ibsen, Théâtre Édouard VII
 1977 : Sigismond by Jean-Jacques Tarbes, Théâtre de Poche Montparnasse
 1980 : Une place au soleil by Georges Michel, Théâtre de Poche Montparnasse
 1981 : Accordez vos violons by Victor Haïm, Théâtre de Poche Montparnasse
 1981 : Le Butin by Joe Orton, Théâtre de Poche Montparnasse
 1982 : Baron, Baronne by Jean-Jacques Varoujean, Théâtre de Poche Montparnasse
 1982 : Souvenirs du faucon maltais by Jean-Pierre Enard, Théâtre de Poche Montparnasse
 1982 : Flock by Sylvain Rougerie, Théâtre de Poche Montparnasse
 1983 : Restaurant de nuit by Michel Bedetti, Théâtre de Poche Montparnasse
 1984 : Le Pharaon by Geva Caban, Théâtre de Poche Montparnasse
 1984 : Le Plaisir de l'amour by Robert Pouderou, Théâtre de Poche Montparnasse
 1984 : Kidnapping by Catherine Rihoit, Théâtre de Poche Montparnasse
 1985 : La Part du rêve by Michèle Ressi, Théâtre de Poche Montparnasse
 1985 : L'Écornifleur by Jules Renard, Théâtre de Poche Montparnasse
 1986 : Amédée, or How to Get Rid of It by Eugène Ionesco, Théâtre de Poche Montparnasse
 1987 : Belle Famille by Victor Haïm, Théâtre de Poche Montparnasse
 1988 : Krapp's Last Tape by Samuel Beckett, Théâtre de Poche Montparnasse
 1988 : Le Plus Heureux des trois by Eugène Labiche, Théâtre de Poche Montparnasse
 1991 : Abraham et Samuel by Victor Haïm
 1991 : Les Empailleurs by Toni Leicester, Théâtre de Poche Montparnasse
 1993 : La Fortune du pot by Jean-François Josselin, Théâtre de Poche Montparnasse
 1996 : L'Argent du beurre by Louis-Charles Sirjacq, Théâtre de Poche Montparnasse
 1998 : 4ème tournant by Josette Boulva and Marie Gatard, Théâtre de Poche Montparnasse
 2002 : Les Directeurs by Daniel Besse, Théâtre de Poche Montparnasse
 2007 : Les Riches reprennent confiance by Louis-Charles Sirjacq, Théâtre de Poche Montparnasse
 2010 : Au nom du fils by Alain Cauchi, Théâtre de Poche Montparnasse

 Uncle Vanya by Anton Chekov
 Three Sisters by Anton Chekov
 Les Petits Bourgeois by Maxim Gorky
 La Vie de Galilée by Bertolt Brecht
 Tchin Tchin by François Billetdoux
 Chez Pierrot by Jean-Claude Grumberg
 L'Embrassement des Alpes by Peter Turrini

Prizes and honours 
 2009 : Prix du Brigadier Brigadier d'honneur pour l'ensemble de sa carrière

References

External links 
 
 Les Archives du Spectacle

French theatre directors
French male stage actors
French male film actors
Male actors from Bordeaux
1918 births
2015 deaths